Cabinet of Radoman Božović was sworn in on 23 December 1991, after the previous cabinet under Dragutin Zelenović resigned due to economic failure. As a Prime Minister of Serbia he was a hardcore bureaucrat, under whom more than half of Serbian economy was under state ownership. After only 100 days in office, the inflation reached record 10,000%. His term was marked by a scandal in which two ministers from his cabinet were arrested, as well as his frequent arguments with opposition leader Vojislav Šešelj. On 10 February 1993, the new minority cabinet of Socialist Party of Serbia, supported by Serbian Radical Party, was formed as a result of the December 20, 1992 parliamentary elections. Božović, himself a Socialist, opposed the support from the Radicals, so he refused another term. This new cabinet was formed by Nikola Šainović.

Cabinet members

See also
Cabinet of Dragutin Zelenović
Cabinet of Nikola Šainović
Socialist Party of Serbia
List of prime ministers of Serbia
Cabinet of Serbia

References

Cabinets of Serbia
Cabinets established in 1991
Cabinets disestablished in 1993
1991 establishments in Yugoslavia